Lauren Elizabeth Colthorpe (born 25 October 1985) is an Australian women's football (soccer) player who played as a midfielder for Brisbane Roar and is a member of the Australian national team.

Club career
Colthorpe joined the Brisbane Roar for the inaugural season of the Westfield W-League in 2008, winning the double in the first season. Colthorpe has featured in all three seasons of the league.

International career
Colthorpe went along with the U-19s national side to Thailand to participate in 2004 FIFA U-19s Women's World Championships. Colthorpe then made her first full debut for the Matilda's in November 2005 in Gosford, New South Wales when Australia defeated China 3–1 in a friendly match. Colthorpe was a part of The Matilda's side that reached the quarter-finals of the 2007 women's world cup. In the quarter-final against Brazil, she scored with a header to level the score at 2–2 before Brazil eventually triumphed 3–2. In 2010, Colthorpe helped Australia win their first silverware in the Asian Cup, mainly playing out of right fullback for most of the campaign.

Career statistics

International goals
Scores and results list Australia's goal tally first.

Honours

Club
Brisbane Roar
 W-League Premiership: 2008–09
 W-League Championship: 2008–09, 2010–11

Country
Australia
 AFC Women's Asian Cup: 2010
 AFF Women's Championship: 2008
 OFC U-20 Women's Championship: 2004

References

External links
 Queensland Roar Profile
 
 
 

1985 births
Living people
Australian women's soccer players
Brisbane Roar FC (A-League Women) players
A-League Women players
2011 FIFA Women's World Cup players
New South Wales Institute of Sport alumni
Australia women's international soccer players
Women's association football defenders
Women's association football midfielders
2007 FIFA Women's World Cup players
Sportswomen from New South Wales
Soccer players from New South Wales
21st-century Australian women